"Dime Tú" is a song by Puerto Rican rapper Anuel AA and Puerto Rican singer Ozuna, released on February 26, 2021. It was released as the fourth single from their collaborative album Los Dioses, by Real Hasta la Muerte and Aura Music.

Composition and music video
The song was written by Anuel AA, Ozuna and Tainy, and produced by Tainy. It is a typical reggaeton tune and finds both Anuel and Ozuna singing about a girl who is playing hard to get. Anuel AA described it as "sometimes it sounds like a single singer". 
The video of "Dime Tú" was released on 26 February 2021, one month after the release of the song, in Anuel AA's YouTube channel and has garnered over 74 million views. It was filmed in Puerto Rico and directed by Fernando Lugo. This was Anuel AA's first filmed music video in his homeland Puerto Rico after his stay in prison.

Charts

References

2021 songs
2021 singles
Anuel AA songs
Ozuna (singer) songs
Songs written by Anuel AA
Songs written by Ozuna (singer)
Spanish-language songs